There are two species of skink named common dwarf skink:

 Menetia greyii, endemic to Australia and Indonesia
 Menetia amaura, native to Western Australia